Aleksandar Senić (born 13 December 1978) is a politician in Serbia. He served in the National Assembly of Serbia from 2012 to 2016, originally with the Democratic Party (Demokratska stranka, DS) and later with the breakaway Social Democratic Party (Socijaldemokratska stranka, SDS). He is now a member of the Serbian Progressive Party.

Early life and career
Senić was born in Smederevska Palanka, in what was then the Socialist Republic of Serbia in the Socialist Federal Republic of Yugoslavia. He has degrees in economics and engineering and is an assistant at the University of Belgrade Faculty of Civil Engineering. He was a special advisor to Serbia's minister of construction and urbanism during the premiership of Zoran Đinđić. Senić is a member of Mensa.

Political career
Senić joined the DS in 2002. He was elected to the Rača municipal assembly in the 2004 and 2012 local elections and was the leader of the DS assembly group.

He received the seventy-first position on the party's Choice for a Better Life electoral list in the 2012 Serbian parliamentary election and narrowly missed direct election when the list won sixty-seven seats. He received a mandate on 4 December 2012 as a replacement for Snežana Malović. The DS served in opposition during this parliament; Senić served as chair of the agriculture committee.

The Democratic Party experienced a serious split in early 2014, with Boris Tadić setting up a breakaway group initially called the New Democratic Party. This group contested the 2014 election in a fusion with the Greens of Serbia and in alliance with other parties. Senić sided with Tadić in the split, was given the tenth position on the alliance's electoral list, and was elected to a second term when the list won eighteen mandates. Serbian Progressive Party and its allies won a majority of seats, and Tadić's group remained in opposition. The New Democratic Party was reconstituted as the Social Democratic Party later in 2014; Senić was considered a close confidante of Tadić at this time.

Senić served as chair of the assembly's European integration committee from 2014 to 2016 and took part in discussions on Serbia's ascension to the European Union (EU). He attracted some media attention in late 2014 when he refused to shave his beard, in protest against what he described as Serbian prime minister Aleksandar Vučić's unwillingness to speak openly about the terms and conditions of Serbia's EU membership.

In March 2015, Senić said that Serbia had a strategic goal of joining the EU by 2020. He added that he did not favour any short-term change in Serbia's trading relations with Russia, notwithstanding the EU's imposition of sanctions following the 2014 pro-Russian unrest in Ukraine. "If Serbia has a market in Russia, it is logical for us to cooperate with the Russians," he said. "At present, we do not have an obligation to break off trade relations with Russia because the European Union is not setting this as a condition." In March 2015, he led an official delegation of the European integration committee to Bulgaria.

Senić was also a member of Serbia's delegation to the Parliamentary Assembly of the Council of Europe in the 2014–16 parliament. He served with the Socialist Group and was a member of the committee on migration, refugees, and displaced persons, and the committee on social affairs, health, and sustainable development.

The SDS contested the 2016 parliamentary election in an alliance with the Liberal Democratic Party and the League of Social Democrats of Vojvodina. Senić received the sixteenth position on the combined list and, as the list won thirteen mandates, was not returned. He did, however, lead the SDS to victory in Rača in the concurrent 2016 local elections.

He left the SDS in June 2016, saying that no-one in the party was willing to take responsibility for its poor performance in the general election. He accepted an invitation to join the Progressive Party the following month, bringing the entire SDS municipal assembly group with him. Following the change, he became the leader of the Progressive Party's assembly group in the municipality and joined the party's main board at the republic level. Some critics said that his decision betrayed the will of the local electorate; Senić responded, "People in Rača did not vote for the SDS but for my team. We have won four times here already."

References

1978 births
Living people
People from Smederevska Palanka
People from Rača
Members of the National Assembly (Serbia)
Members of the Parliamentary Assembly of the Council of Europe
Democratic Party (Serbia) politicians
Social Democratic Party (Serbia) politicians
Socialist Group politicians
Serbian Progressive Party politicians